Wolfgang Hellmich (born 5 May 1958) is a German politician of the Social Democratic Party (SPD) who has been serving as a member of the Bundestag from the state of North Rhine-Westphalia since 2012.

Political career 
Hellmich became a member of the Bundestag in 2012 when he took the seat vacated by Michael Groschek. He is a member of the Defence Committee – which he chaired from 2015 until 2021 – and the 1st Committee of Inquiry of the Defence Committee. 

In addition to his committee assignments, Hellmich co-chaired the German-Slovenian Parliamentary Friendship Group from 2014 until 2019. Since 2014, he has also been a member of the German delegation to the NATO Parliamentary Assembly, where he is part of the Defence and Security Committee and the Political Committee. In 2022, he joined the parliamentary body charged with overseeing a 100 billion euro special fund to strengthen Germany’s armed forces.

Other activities
 Deutsche Maritime Akademie, Member of the Advisory Board 
 IG Bergbau, Chemie, Energie (IG BCE), Member
 IG Metall, Member

References

External links 

  
 Bundestag biography 

1958 births
Living people
Members of the Bundestag for North Rhine-Westphalia
Members of the Bundestag 2021–2025
Members of the Bundestag 2017–2021
Members of the Bundestag 2013–2017
Members of the Bundestag 2009–2013
Members of the Bundestag for the Social Democratic Party of Germany